Toronto 2008 was one of the five short-listed bids for the 2008 Games, presented by the city of Toronto, Ontario, Canada.

Toronto received permission to represent Canada from the Canadian Olympic Association (chosen over Vancouver). 
On January 16, 2000, the bid committee received a financial support guarantee from the province of Ontario, and it was sent to the IOC along with the bid book.

Toronto's bid was led by a Toronto citizen John Bitove, a businessman and founder of the Toronto Raptors of the NBA. The bid focused the Olympic events on a compact area along the city's Lake Ontario waterfront. The Olympic village would have been built on reclaimed industrial areas, and the city's plans called for construction of a new rapid transit network connecting the venues.

The evaluation committee spoke highly of Toronto's bid. In particular, they noted the city's financial plan, the concentration of athletes into a central Olympic area, and existing transportation infrastructure as positives. The Evaluation Report stated that 

By June 2001, Toronto and Beijing were in close competition for selection as the host city. That month, the mayor of Toronto, Mel Lastman, made a derogatory remark about the city of Mombasa, Kenya, just before a trip to that country to lobby IOC officials. The comment provoked controversy around the world, and particular concern among African delegates to the IOC. Press reports suggested that the comments may have influenced the decision of the IOC.

It was the second time that Toronto had lost a bid to host a Summer Olympics, as they bid for the 1996 Games, but lost to Atlanta. But two years later, the Canadian city of Vancouver bid to host the 2010 Winter Olympics and won.

Bid details 
According to organisers, 70% of the venues needed to host the Olympics in Toronto had already been built. The proposed venues concept comprised:

Competition venues

References

2008 Summer Olympics bids